Heavier Than Air – Rarest Eggs is an album of compiled live tracks spanning Budgie's career. We Came, We Saw... is a companion to this album.

Track listing
Disc 1:
"Rape of the Locks"
"Rocking Man"
"Young Is a World"
"Hot as a Docker's Armpit"
"Sky High Percentage"
"In the Grip of a Tyrefitter's Hand"
"I Turned to Stone"
"You're a Superstar"
"She Used Me Up"
"Hot as a Docker's Armpit"
"The Author"
"Whiskey River"
"Nude Disintegrating Parachutist Woman"

Disc 2:
"Breadfan"
"You're the Biggest Thing Since Powdered Milk"
"Melt The Ice Away"
"In the Grip of a Tyrefitter's Hand"
"Smile Boy Smile"
"In for the Kill/You're the Biggest Thing Since Powdered Milk"
"Love for You and Me"
"Parents"
"Who Do You Want for Your Love"
"Don't Dilute the Water"
"Breaking All the House Rules"
"Breadfan"

Disc One:
Tracks 1-4 feature Burke Shelley, Tony Bourge and Ray Philips
Tracks 5, 6 feature Shelley, Bourge, Steve Williams and Myfyr Isaac
Tracks 7-9 feature Shelley, John Thomas and Williams
Tracks 10-13 feature Shelley, Bourge and Philips
Disc Two:
Tracks 1, 2 feature Shelley, Bourge and Philips
Tracks 3-12 feature Shelley, Bourge, Williams and Isaac
Disc One: 1972, 1976 & 1981 BBC Worldwide Music
Disc Two: 1974, 1978 Budgie This Compilation © 1998 New

References

Budgie (band) live albums
1998 live albums